Gaar may refer to:

Gaar Williams (1880–1935), American cartoonist
Gaar-Scott, American threshing machine and steam traction engine manufacturer
Gaar Corner, Oklahoma, unincorporated place in Oklahoma, United States
GAAR (India) or General Anti-Avoidance Rule, India 2012
GAAR or General Anti-Avoidance Rule as a response to tax avoidance in any country
Galeshewe Anti-Aircraft Regiment, an artillery regiment of the South African Army